Frederick Wallis White (February 19, 1878 – May 29, 1960) was a Canadian businessman and early ice hockey player. He played for the Ottawa Hockey Club in the 1890s and 1900s. He was a member of the 'Silver Seven' team which won the Stanley Cup in 1905. He went on to a successful business career in scientific instruments.

Career
Born in Ottawa, Ontario, Canada, White was the son of Col. Frank White and Clara Cluice. White attended Ashbury College and Bishop's University.

White joined the Ottawas for the 1895–96 season, when the team was an amateur team competing in the Amateur Hockey Association of Canada (AHAC). White was not a star for the team, and played with Ottawas and various teams in the Ottawa City Hockey League. His final season with Ottawa was the 1904–05 season, joining the club for the first two games of the regular season, and the Stanley Cup challenges by the Dawson City Nuggets and the Rat Portage Thistles.

White was an employee with the Canadian Pacific Railways (CPR) before starting his own firm Ontario Hugh-Owens Company in 1913. He later was an executive with Computing Devices, Builders Sales and Kelvin-Hughes of Ottawa. White was active in local Ottawa sports with the Royal Ottawa Golf Club, Rideau Club. He was also a member of the board of governors of Carleton University.

References

External links
 

1878 births
1960 deaths
Businesspeople from Ottawa
Canadian ice hockey players
Ice hockey people from Ottawa
Ottawa Senators (original) players
Stanley Cup champions